Prof Andrew Tindal Phillipson FRSE (1910–1977) was a 20th-century British veterinary surgeon and physiologist.

Life
He was born in London on 19 August 1910 the second son of John Tindal Phillipson and his wife, Cicely Gough Paterson. He was educated at Christ's College in Finchley in London. He then studied at St Catharine's College, Cambridge, graduating BA in 1931.

In 1947 he became Head of Physiology at the Rowett Research Institute, becoming Depute Director in 1952.

In 1953 he was elected a Fellow of the Royal Society of Edinburgh. His proposers were David Cuthbertson, Ernest Cruickshank, William Ogilvy Kermack, Vero Wynne-Edwards and Robert Campbell Garry.

In 1963 he became Professor of Veterinary Clinical Studies at Cambridge University.

He died on 10 January 1977.

Family
In 1936 he married Rachel Margaret Young, a sister of John Zachary Young. They had three sons.

Publications
Physiology of Digestion and Metabolism in the Ruminant (1970)
Scientific Foundations of Veterinary Medicine (1980)

References

1910 births
1977 deaths
Scientists from London
Alumni of St Catharine's College, Cambridge
Academics of the University of Cambridge
British veterinarians
Fellows of the Royal Society of Edinburgh